Pastel Blues is a studio album by American singer Nina Simone, released in October 1965, by Philips Records. 

The album was recorded in 1964 and 1965 in New York City and peaked at number 139 on the Billboard 200 chart, as well as number 8 on the Hot R&B LPs chart. The album was re-issued in November 2020 by Verve and Universal Music Enterprises as part of their "audiophile-grade" Acoustic Sounds series.

Critical reception

Richie Unterberger of AllMusic gave the album 3.5 stars out of 5 and called it "one of Nina Simone's more subdued mid-'60s LPs, putting the emphasis on her piano rather than band arrangements." He added, "By far the most impressive track is her frantic ten-minute rendition of the traditional 'Sinnerman,' an explosive tour de force that dwarfs everything else on the album."

Joe Muggs of Noisey said, "This is the blues as both urban and urbane, delivered with full knowledge of and passion for its history, and with all the guts and power that white rockers could ever muster, but with all the finesse, sophistication and abstraction that her Juilliard classical training could bring to bear on it."

In 2008, Cokemachineglow included it on the "30 'Other' Albums of the 1960s" list. In 2012, Alicia Keys included it on her "25 Favorite Albums" list. In 2017, Pitchfork placed it at number 21 on the "200 Best Albums of the 1960s" list.

Track listing

Personnel
Credits adapted from liner notes.

 Nina Simone – piano, vocals, arrangement
 Al Schackman – guitar, harmonica
 Rudy Stevenson – guitar, flute
 Lisle Atkinson – double bass
 Bobby Hamilton – drums

Charts

References

External links
 

1965 albums
Nina Simone albums
Philips Records albums
Albums produced by Hal Mooney